Kevin William Batch (born 24 June 1941) is a former Australian rules footballer who played with South Melbourne in the Victorian Football League (VFL).

Notes

External links 

Living people
1941 births
Australian rules footballers from Victoria (Australia)
Sydney Swans players
Box Hill Football Club players